WAPP or Wapp may refer to:

 WAPP-LP, a radio station (100.3 FM) licensed to Westhampton, New York, United States
 Washington Progressive Party, a political party in Washington state, United States
 West African Power Pool, a cooperation of the national electricity companies in Western Africa
 Women Against Private Police, a civil rights organization in Baltimore, Maryland, United States
 WKTU, a radio station (103.5 FM) licensed to Lake Success, New York, United States, which formerly used the call sign WAPP-FM
 A variant of the open-source software program BAPP
 Pattimura International Airport (ICAO:WAPP), Indonesia

People with the surname
 Josephine Myers-Wapp (1912–2014), Comanche weaver and educator
 Thomas Wapp (born 1972), Swiss badminton player